The 2020–21 Real Madrid Club de Fútbol season was the club's 117th season in existence and the 90th consecutive season in the top flight of Spanish football. In addition to the domestic league, Real Madrid participated in this season's editions of the Copa del Rey, the Supercopa de España, and the UEFA Champions League. The season covered the period from 8 August 2020 to 30 June 2021.

Real Madrid played the entire season at the Alfredo Di Stéfano Stadium, while the Santiago Bernabéu was undergoing a structural renovation.

Despite finishing a close second in the league and advancing to the Champions League semi-finals for the first time since 2018, Real Madrid went trophyless for the first time since the 2009–10 season.

Summary

September
The first league match of the season, on 20 September, ended in a goalless draw at Real Sociedad. On 26 September, Real secured their first win of the season by defeating Real Betis 3–2 away from home, with goals from Federico Valverde, Sergio Ramos and an own goal. Four days later, a Vinícius Júnior goal clinched the three points against Real Valladolid in the first home game of the season.

October
On 4 October, goals from Vinícius and Karim Benzema got Madrid another three points in a 2–0 away victory against Levante. After the international break, Madrid lost a home game to Cádiz 0–1 on 17 October. Four days later, Madrid fell 2–3 to Shakhrtar Donetsk in their opening Champions League match, despite second half goals from Modrić and Vinícius after being down 0–3. The first El Clásico of the season was played on 24 October, with Madrid winning 3–1 at Camp Nou. Valverde, Ramos and Modrić scored the goals. Three days later, Benzema and Casemiro scored two late goals to give Real a 2–2 draw in the Champions League at Borussia Mönchengladbach. On the last day of October, a brace from Benzema and goals from Valverde and Eden Hazard secured a 4–1 home win over Huesca.

November
The new month kicked off with a 3–2 home win against Inter Milan in the Champions League on 3 November. The goalscorers were Benzema, Ramos and Rodrygo. Five days later, despite an opening goal from Benzema, Madrid lost 1–4 to Valencia away from home, while giving up three penalties and an own goal. On 21 November, after the second international break, Real came away with a 1–1 draw at Villarreal, despite getting an early lead after a goal from Mariano. Four days later, an early penalty from Hazard and an own goal secured three points in the away Champions League match against Inter. The home match against Deportivo Alavés was lost 1–2 on 28 November, with Casemiro scoring the lone goal.

December
On the first day of the new month, Madrid once again lost to Donetsk in the Champions League, this time 0–2 on the road. Four days later, Sevilla was defeated 1–0 at the Ramón Sánchez Pizjuán, thanks to an own goal. On 9 December, Madrid defeated Borussia Mönchengladbach in the Champions League 2–0 at home, with Benzema scoring both goals. With the win, Madrid topped Group B and advanced to the knockout stage. Three days later, a Casemiro goal and an own goal gave Real a 2–0 home victory over Atlético Madrid. On 15 December, a brace from Benzema and a goal from Toni Kroos saw Madrid get away with another home win, this time defeating Athletic Bilbao 3–1. Goals from Benzema, Modrić and Vázquez helped Madrid to a 3–1 away win over Eibar, moving the team to second place. On 23 December, Real Madrid secured a 2–0 home win against Granada, with Casemiro and Benzema on the scoresheet. A week later, in the last game of 2020, a Modrić goal was not enough as Madrid drew Elche 1–1 away from home to finish the year in second place.

January
Real started the new year with a 2–0 win over Celta Vigo at the Alfredo Di Stéfano on 2 January. The goals were scored by Vázquez and Marco Asensio. A week later, the match at Osasuna ended in a goalless draw. On 14 January, Madrid lost the semi-final of the 2020–21 Supercopa de España against Athletic Bilbao 1–2, with a second half goal from Benzema not being enough. Real was knocked out of the 2020–21 Copa del Rey in the round of 32 exactly six days later, after losing 1–2  at Alcoyano, where Éder Militão initially gave Madrid the lead. On 23 January, Real defeated Alavés 4–1 on the road, with a brace from Benzema and goals from Casemiro and Hazard. A week later, ten-man Madrid lost the home match against Levante 1–2, even though Asensio gave Real an early lead.

February
A brace from Raphaël Varane helped produce a 2–1 come-from-behind win at Huesca on 6 February. Three days later, Madrid hosted Getafe and won 2–0 after goals from Benzema and Ferland Mendy. On 14 February, goals from Benzema and Kroos secured another three points in a 2–0 home win against Valencia. Six days later, a second-half Casemiro goal helped Madrid to a 1–0 win over Valladolid at the José Zorrilla. On 24 February, Atalanta was defeated 1–0 in Bergamo, thanks to a goal from Mendy, in the first leg of the Champions League round of 16.

March
On the first day of the new month, the home game against Sociedad ended in a 1–1 draw, with the goal coming from Vinícius in the closing minutes. In a derby against Atlético at the Wanda Metropolitano on 7 March, Benzema scored a late equalizer with the same result, securing Madrid a point. Six days later, a brace from Benzema gave Madrid a 2–1 come-from-behind victory over Elche at the Di Stéfano. On 16 March, Madrid secured their qualification for the quarter-finals of the Champions League with a 3–1 home win over Atalanta. The goals were scored by Benzema, Ramos and Asensio. Four days later, a brace from Benzema and a goal from Asensio saw Madrid win 3–1 at Celta Vigo.

April
On 3 April, Real defeated Eibar 2–0 at home with goals from Asensio and Benzema. Three days later, Madrid defeated Liverpool 3–1 at the Di Stéfano in the crucial first leg of the Champions League quarter-finals. Vinícius scored a brace, with another goal coming from Asensio. The season's second El Clásico was won 2–1 on 10 April with goals from Benzema and Kroos. Four days later, the return leg against Liverpool ended 0–0, meaning Madrid qualified for the Champions League semi-finals. On 18 April, Real were held to a goalless draw at Getafe. Three days later, a brace from Benzema and a goal from Álvaro Odriozola gave Madrid a 3–0 away victory over Cádiz. The crucial home match against Betis on 24 April 2021 ended in a 0–0 draw, damaging Real's title aspirations. Three days later, a Benzema goal secured a 1–1 home draw against Chelsea in the first leg of the Champions League semi-finals.

May
On 1 May, Militao and Casemiro scored late to help Madrid post a 2–0 home win versus Osasuna. Four days later, Real's Champions League campaign came to an end at the semi-final stage after a 0–2 away loss to Chelsea. Another four days later, an Asensio goal and a late deflection from Hazard helped Madrid salvage a point in the home game against Sevilla, keeping them alive in the title race. The away match against Granada on 13 May was won 4–1, with goals coming from Modrić, Rodrygo, Odriozola and Benzema. Three days later, a goal from Nacho secured Madrid a 1–0 win at Athletic Bilbao. With that win, Real stayed in second position, two points behind leaders Atlético Madrid, with one match to go. On 22 May, Madrid produced a late comeback to defeat Villarreal 2–1 at home in the last match of the season, with Benzema and Modrić scoring the goals. Since Atlético also won their game, Real finished second in the standings. This marked the club's first trophyless season since 2009–10.

Players

Transfers

In

Out

New contracts

Pre-season and friendlies

Competitions

Overview

La Liga

League table

Results summary

Results by round

Matches
The league fixtures were announced on 31 August 2020.

Score overview

Copa del Rey

Madrid entered the tournament in the round of 32, as they had participated in the 2020–21 Supercopa de España.

Supercopa de España

The draw was held on 17 December 2020.

UEFA Champions League

Group stage

The group stage draw was held on 1 October 2020.

Knockout phase

Round of 16
The draw for the round of 16 was held on 14 December 2020.

Quarter-finals
The draw for the quarter-finals and semi-finals was held on 19 March 2021.

Semi-finals

Statistics

Squad statistics

‡ Player left the club mid-season

Goals

Clean sheets

Disciplinary record

Notes

References

External links

Real Madrid CF seasons
Real Madrid
Real Madrid